John Lorenz Moser (born 23 December 1985), better known by his stage name Bonez MC, is a German rapper, singer, songwriter, and record producer.

Bonez is a member of the German hip hop gang 187 Strassenbande consisting of the rappers Gzuz, Maxwell, LX, Sa4 and Bonez MC, graffiti artist Frost and music producer Jambeatz. At various times, rappers AchtVier, Mosh36 and Hasuna were also members of the 187 Strassenbande.

In 2012, Bonez MC released his debut album Krampfhaft kriminell on his own label Toprott Muzik. In 2013 he had a joint EP with Kontra K followed by another collaboration with fellow 187 Strassenbande member Gzuz in form of the album High und Hungrig. On 30 January 2015, 187 Strassenbande produced his compilation High & Hungrig 2.

Bonez MC is one of the most successful German music artists, 3 of his collaborative albums have gold status and of which one also reached platinum status. 
 
He is particularly known for his collaborations with RAF Camora and Gzuz. His most successful singles are Palmen aus Plastik, Ohne mein Team and Mörder with RAF Camora.

Awards
At Hiphop.de Awards
 2016: Best National Group (jointly with RAF Camora)
 2016: Best National Release (for Palmen aus Plastik jointly with RAF Camora)
 2016: Best National Video (for Palmen aus Gold jointly with RAF Camora)
 2018: Best National Group (jointly with RAF Camora)

At 1Live Krone
 2016: Best Hip-Hop Act (jointly with RAF Camora)

At Juice Awards
 2016: Best National Album (for Palmen aus Plastik with RAF Camora)

Discography

 Krampfhaft kriminell (2012)
 Hollywood (2020)
 Hollywood Uncut (2020)

References

External links

 187 Strassenbande website

German rappers
1985 births
Living people
Musicians from Hamburg